Zemeros is a genus of butterflies that belongs to the family Riodinidae.

Species
 Zemeros flegyas
 Zemeros emesoides

References
 Zemeros at Markku Savela's website on Lepidoptera

Nemeobiinae
Butterfly genera
Taxa named by Jean Baptiste Boisduval